Sulzburg Jewish Cemetery is a Jewish burial place located in Sulzburg, Baden-Württemberg, Germany. It is listed as a heritage site.

Location
The Jewish cemetery is located on Badstraße in Berholz Forest. It spreads over 61.48 ares.

History
The cemetery was probably built in the mid-16th century. Jews from Sulzburg and neighbouring locations were buried there until a collective Jewish cemetery was opened in Lörrach in 1670. During several decades, no grave was added and the cemetery fell into ruin.

In 1717, the cemetery recovered its initial role. The small room was built at this time. The cemetery has 462 graves, the oldest datable one being from 1737. Evidence of desecration can be seen in the modern part of the cemetery.

In 1970, a monument was erected to commemorate the victims of the persecution of Jews in the Third Reich.

References

Jewish cemeteries in Baden-Württemberg
Buildings and structures in Breisgau-Hochschwarzwald
Buildings and structures completed in the 16th century
16th-century establishments in the Holy Roman Empire
Heritage sites in Baden-Württemberg
Cemetery vandalism and desecration